Friedrich Hossbach (22 November 1894 – 10 September 1980) was a German staff officer in the Wehrmacht who in 1937 was the military adjutant to Adolf Hitler. Hossbach created the document that later became known as the Hossbach Memorandum.

Career
Hossbach created the document that later became known as the Hossbach Memorandum, a report of a meeting held on 5 November 1937 between Hitler and Feldmarschall Werner von Blomberg, General Werner von Fritsch, Admiral Erich Raeder, Generaloberst Hermann Göring, Baron Konstantin von Neurath and Hossbach. The account of Hossbach was found among the Nuremberg papers, where it was an important piece of evidence.

In early 1938, Hossbach was present when Hitler was presented by Goering with a file purporting to show that General von Fritsch, the commander-in-chief of the Army, was guilty of homosexual practices. In defiance of Hitler's orders, Hossbach took the file to Fritsch to warn him of the accusations that he was about to face. Fritsch gave his word as an officer that the charges were untrue, and Hossbach passed that message back to Hitler. That did not, as it might have, cost Hossbach his life, but he was dismissed from his post as Hitler's adjutant two days later. 

Hossbach was restored to the general staff in 1939 and promoted to major general on the 1st of March 1942. Exactly five months later, he was promoted again to lieutenant general, and his last promotion occurred on 1 November 1943, when he became general of infantry and was given command of the 16th Panzer Corps. He spent the next two years on the Eastern Front. He took over as commander of the 4th Army on 28 January 1945 but was dismissed two days later for defying Hitler's orders and withdrawing his troops from East Prussia in fear of a second Stalingrad.

Awards
 Iron Cross (1914) 2nd Class (26 September 1914) & 1st Class (26 May 1916)
 Clasp to the Iron Cross (1939) 2nd Class (11 May 1940) and 1st Class (30 May 1940)
 Honour Roll Clasp of the Army (22 July 1941)
 Knight's Cross of the Iron Cross with Oak Leaves
 Knight's Cross on 7 October 1940 as Oberst and commander of Infanterie-Regiment 82
 Oak Leaves on 11 September 1943 as Generalleutnant and acting commander of LVI. Panzerkorps

References

Citations

Bibliography

 Jones, Michael (2011) "Total War. From Stalingrad to Berlin". John Murray, London. 
 
 
Who's Who in Nazi Germany''. Routledge, 1995. 

1894 births
1980 deaths
Military personnel from North Rhine-Westphalia
Generals of Infantry (Wehrmacht)
Recipients of the clasp to the Iron Cross, 1st class
Recipients of the Knight's Cross of the Iron Cross with Oak Leaves
Adjutants of Adolf Hitler
People from Unna